Antonio Latorre Grueso (born 21 November 1997), known as Toni Lato or simply Lato, is a Spanish professional footballer who plays for Valencia CF as a left back.

Formed at Valencia, he made over 90 appearances for the club, winning the Copa del Rey in 2019 and also featuring on loan at Osasuna in La Liga.

Club career
Born in La Pobla de Vallbona, Valencia, Lato was a Valencia CF youth graduate. He made his debut as a senior with the reserves on 29 March 2014, coming on as a second-half substitute in a 0–0 home draw against Elche CF Ilicitano.

On 25 June 2015, Lato signed a new contract with the Che, agreeing to a five-year deal and being definitely promoted to the B-team. On 6 January of the following year he was first included in a first team matchday, remaining unused in a 4–0 home win against Granada CF for the season's Copa del Rey last 16. He made his first team debut on 25 February 2016, replacing fellow youth graduate José Luis Gayà at half time in a 4–0 UEFA Europa League away routing of SK Rapid Wien; his first La Liga game was the following 9 January, when he came on as a half-time substitute for Guilherme Siqueira in a 3–3 draw against CA Osasuna.

Lato scored his first competitive goal for the Che on 18 April 2019, netting the first in a 2–0 home defeat of Villarreal CF for the season's Europa League, helping his team qualify for the semifinals as a result. He was unused on 25 May as the team beat league champions FC Barcelona 2–1 in the 2019 Copa del Rey Final. On 5 July, he signed a contract extension with Valencia until 2023; his release clause was set at €80 million.

Immediately after signing the extension, Lato was loaned out to Eredivisie side PSV Eindhoven for one year. He left the club on 26 December, after playing just in the stoppage time of a 3–0 Europa League home win against Apollon Limassol and two appearances for the B-team in the Eerste Divisie; he was also publicly criticised by manager Mark van Bommel.

On the same day as leaving the Netherlands, Lato was loaned to Osasuna in the Spanish top tier, until the end of the season. He scored his first La Liga goal on 24 June by netting the game's only goal in an away defeat of Deportivo Alavés. On 23 October, he scored his first such goal for Valencia, consolation in a 2–1 loss at Elche CF; he continued to face competition not only from Gayà but from another academy product, Jesús Vázquez.

Personal life
Lato's father, also named Antonio, and uncle Vicente were both footballers. The latter played mostly for Valencia's city rivals, Levante UD.

Career statistics

Club

Honours
Valencia
 Copa del Rey: 2018–19

References

External links
Profile at the Valencia CF website

Stats and Bio at Ciberche 

1997 births
Living people
People from Camp de Túria
Sportspeople from the Province of Valencia
Spanish footballers
Association football defenders
Spain youth international footballers
Spain under-21 international footballers
La Liga players
Segunda División B players
Valencia CF Mestalla footballers
Valencia CF players
CA Osasuna players
Eerste Divisie players
PSV Eindhoven players
Jong PSV players
Spanish expatriate footballers
Expatriate footballers in the Netherlands
Spanish expatriate sportspeople in the Netherlands